Oio or OIO may refer to:

 Oio Region in Guinea-Bissau
 Oio railway station in New Zealand
 ōʻio, the Hawaiian name for bonefish
 Overseas Investment Office in New Zealand
 Iodine Dioxide